Joan Marsh (July 10, 1914 – August 10, 2000) was an American child actress in silent films between 1915 and 1921. Later, during the sound era, she resumed her acting career and performed in a variety of films during the 1930s and 1940s.

Early years
Marsh, born Dorothy D. Rosher, was the daughter of Lolita and Charles Rosher. Her parents later divorced.

Career
In 1915, Marsh made her first film appearance, an uncredited one, in the short The Mad Maid of the Forest, which her father was filming. Later that same year she was also cast in Hearts Aflame and then billed as Dorothy Rosher. In 1917 she appeared too in A Little Princess and in no less than five other productions in 1918, including the comedy-drama Women's Weapons for Paramount Pictures. After these minor roles as a baby and toddler, Marsh finally became a star in Mary Pickford films such as Daddy-Long-Legs (1919) and Pollyanna (1920).

Marsh made her last film appearance as a child in 1921 but returned to films nine years later with a role in King of Jazz, in which she sang with Bing Crosby. She subsequently worked in a series of shorts and other feature films before she played W. C. Fields's daughter in You're Telling Me! in 1934.  She continued performing on-screen in small roles for the next decade. In 1936, she sang on the CBS radio program Flying Red Horse Tavern.

In 1931, Marsh was one of 13 actresses named as WAMPAS baby stars.

She made her final film appearance in 1944 in Follow the Leader.

Personal life 
During the filming of Charlie Chan on Broadway, Marsh met writer Charles Belden, who had co-written the film's screenplay. They married on December 2, 1938, in Beverly Hills, California. Their marriage ended in divorce in 1943—first in Los Angeles, California, on August 26, 1943, followed by a second divorce October 23, 1943, "so she won't have to wait a year before remarrying."

In 1943, Marsh married Army Captain John D. W. Morrill in Santa Monica, California.

Later years and death
Marsh later managed a stationery shop. She died at age 86 in Ojai, California on August 10, 2000.

Partial filmography

 Hearts Aflame (1915) - Child
 A Little Princess (1917) - Child (uncredited)
 How Could You Jean? (1918) - Morley Child
 Johanna Enlists (1918) - (uncredited)
 The Bond (1918, Short) - Cupid (uncredited)
 Women's Weapons (1918) - Nicholas Jr.'s Sister
 Captain Kidd, Jr. (1919) - Child (uncredited)
 Daddy-Long-Legs (1919) - (uncredited)
 Pollyanna (1920) - Dorothy Rosher
 Suds (1920) - Minor Role (uncredited)
 Young Mrs. Winthrop (1920) - Rosie
 Thou Art the Man (1920) - Ellie Prescott
 Little Lord Fauntleroy (1921) - (uncredited)
 King of Jazz (1930) - Blonde ("A Bench in the Park") (uncredited)
 All Quiet on the Western Front (1930) - Poster Girl (uncredited)
 The Little Accident (1931) - Doris
 Inspiration (1931) - Madeleine Dorety
 Dance, Fools, Dance (1931) - Sylvia
 A Tailor Made Man (1931) - Beanie
 Meet the Wife (1931) - Doris Bellamy
 Three Girls Lost (1931) - Marcia Tallant
 Shipmates (1931) - Mary Lou
 Politics (1931) - Daisy Evans
 Maker of Men (1931) - Dorothy
 The Wet Parade (1932) - Evelyn Fessenden
 Are You Listening? (1932) - Honey O'Neil
 Bachelor's Affairs (1932) - Eva Mills
 That's My Boy (1932) - Co-ed (uncredited)
 Speed Demon (1932) - Jean Torrance
 High Gear (1933) - Anne Merritt
 Daring Daughters (1933) - Betty Cummings
 The Man Who Dared (1933) - Joan Novak
 It's Great to Be Alive (1933) - Toots
 Three-Cornered Moon (1933) - Kitty
 Rainbow Over Broadway (1933) - Judy Chibbins
 You're Telling Me! (1934) - Pauline Bisbee
 Many Happy Returns (1934) - Florence Allen
 We're Rich Again (1934) - Carolyn 'Carrie' Page
 Champagne for Breakfast (1935) - Vivian Morton
 Anna Karenina (1935) - Lili
 Dancing Feet (1936) - Judy Jones
 Brilliant Marriage (1936) - Madge Allison
 What Becomes of the Children? (1936) - Marion Worthington
 Charlie Chan on Broadway (1937) - Joan Wendall
 Hot Water (1937) - Bebe Montaine
 Life Begins in College (1937) - Cuddles
 The Lady Objects (1938) - June Lane
 Idiot's Delight (1939) - one of Harry Van's Les Blondes!
 Fast and Loose (1939) - Bobby Neville
 Blame It on Love (1940) - Terry Arden
 Road to Zanzibar (1941) - Dimples
 The Man in the Trunk (1942) - Yvonne Duvalle
 Police Bullets (1942) - Donna Wells
 Keep 'Em Slugging (1943) - Lola
 Secret Service in Darkest Africa (1943, Serial) - Janet Blake
 Mr. Muggs Steps Out (1943) - Brenda Murray
 Follow the Leader (1944) - Milly McGinnis (final film role)

Notes

References

External links

Photographs of Joan Marsh

1914 births
2000 deaths
20th-century American actresses
American film actresses
American people of English descent
American silent film actresses
Actresses from California
People from Porterville, California
WAMPAS Baby Stars